Casa Massip-Dolsa  is a historical house at 22 Avinguda de Meritxell in Andorra la Vella, Andorra. Built in 1938–39, it is registered in the Cultural Heritage of Andorra.

References

Buildings and structures in Andorra la Vella
Houses in Andorra
Houses completed in 1939
Cultural Heritage of Andorra